Benjamin Randall was a member of the Wisconsin State Assembly.

Biography
Randall was born on April 28, 1793 in Hopkinton, Rhode Island. In 1845, he settled with his family in what would become Lebanon, Dodge County, Wisconsin. Randall died on April 24, 1863. His son, Barber Randall, became a Republican politician.

Career
Randall was a member of the Assembly during the 1st Wisconsin Legislature. He was a Democrat.

References

External links

People from Hopkinton, Rhode Island
People from Lebanon, Dodge County, Wisconsin
Democratic Party members of the Wisconsin State Assembly
1793 births
1863 deaths
Burials in Wisconsin
19th-century American politicians